Šumarina is a settlement in the region of Baranja, Croatia. Administratively, it is located in the Beli Manastir municipality within the Osijek-Baranja County.

References

Populated places in Osijek-Baranja County
Baranya (region)